Ricardo González (born 17 March 1947) is a Colombian former swimmer. He competed in four events at the 1968 Summer Olympics.

References

1947 births
Living people
Colombian male swimmers
Olympic swimmers of Colombia
Swimmers at the 1968 Summer Olympics
Pan American Games competitors for Colombia
Swimmers at the 1971 Pan American Games
People from Caquetá Department
20th-century Colombian people
21st-century Colombian people